Ludwig Heinrich Edler von Mises (29 September 1881 – 10 October 1973) was an Austrian School economist, historian, logician, and sociologist. Mises wrote and lectured extensively on the societal contributions of classical liberalism. He is best known for his work on praxeology studies comparing communism and capitalism. He is considered one of the most influential economic and political thinkers of the 20th century.

Mises emigrated from Austria to the United States in 1940. Since the mid-20th century, libertarian movements have been strongly influenced by Mises's writings. Mises' student Friedrich Hayek viewed Mises as one of the major figures in the revival of classical liberalism in the post-war era. Hayek's work "The Transmission of the Ideals of Freedom" (1951) pays high tribute to the influence of Mises in the 20th century libertarian movement.

Mises's Private Seminar was a leading group of economists. Many of its alumni, including Friedrich Hayek and Oskar Morgenstern, emigrated from Austria to the United States and Great Britain. Mises has been described as having approximately seventy close students in Austria.

Biography

Early life 

Ludwig von Mises was born to Jewish parents in the city of Lemberg, Galicia, Austria-Hungary. The family of his father, Arthur Edler von Mises, had been elevated to the Austrian nobility in the 19th century (Edler indicates a noble landless family), and they had been involved in financing and constructing railroads. His mother Adele (née Landau) was a niece of Joachim Landau, a Liberal Party deputy to the Austrian Parliament. Arthur von Mises was stationed in Lemberg as a construction engineer with the Czernowitz railway company.

By the age of 12, Mises spoke fluent German, Russian, Polish and French, read Latin and could understand Ukrainian. Mises had a younger brother, Richard von Mises, who became a mathematician and a member of the Vienna Circle, and a probability theorist. When Ludwig and Richard were still children, their family moved back to Vienna.

In 1900, Mises attended the University of Vienna, becoming influenced by the works of Carl Menger. Mises's father died in 1903. Three years later, Mises was awarded his doctorate from the school of law in 1906.

Life in Europe 
In the years from 1904 to 1914, Mises attended lectures given by Austrian economist Eugen von Böhm-Bawerk. He graduated in February 1906 (Juris Doctor) and started a career as a civil servant in Austria's financial administration.

After a few months, he left to take a trainee position in a Vienna law firm. During that time, Mises began lecturing on economics and in early 1909 joined the Austrian Chamber of Commerce and Industry, serving as economic adviser to the Austrian government until he left Austria in 1934. During World War I, Mises served as a front officer in the Austro-Hungarian artillery and as an economic adviser to the War Department.

Mises was chief economist for the Austrian Chamber of Commerce and was an economic adviser of Engelbert Dollfuss, the austrofascist Austrian Chancellor. Later, Mises was economic adviser to Otto von Habsburg, the Christian democratic politician and claimant to the throne of Austria (which had been legally abolished in 1918 following the Great War). In 1934, Mises left Austria for Geneva, Switzerland, where he was a professor at the Graduate Institute of International Studies until 1940.

While in Switzerland, Mises married Margit Herzfeld Serény, a former actress and widow of Ferdinand Serény. She was the mother of Gitta Sereny.

Work in the United States 

In 1940, Mises and his wife fled the German advance in Europe and emigrated to New York City in the United States. He had come to the United States under a grant by the Rockefeller Foundation. Like many other classical liberal scholars who fled to the United States, he received support from the William Volker Fund to obtain a position in American universities. Mises became a visiting professor at New York University and held this position from 1945 until his retirement in 1969, though he was not salaried by the university. Businessman and libertarian commentator Lawrence Fertig, a member of the New York University Board of Trustees, funded Mises and his work.

For part of this period, Mises studied currency issues for the Pan-Europa movement, which was led by Richard von Coudenhove-Kalergi, a fellow New York University faculty member and Austrian exile. In 1947, Mises became one of the founding members of the Mont Pelerin Society.

In 1962, Mises received the Austrian Decoration for Science and Art for political economy at the Austrian Embassy in Washington, D.C.

Mises retired from teaching at the age of 87 and died at the age of 92 in New York. He is buried at Ferncliff Cemetery in Hartsdale, New York. Grove City College houses the 20,000-page archive of Mises papers and unpublished works.<ref name=GCC>Austrian Student Scholars Conference Announcement, Grove City College website, 2013, accessed June 8, 2013.</ref> The personal library of Mises was given to Hillsdale College as bequeathed in his will.http://www.iea.org.uk/sites/default/files/publications/files/upldbook514pdf.pdf 

At one time, Mises praised the work of writer Ayn Rand, and she generally looked on his work with favor, but the two had a volatile relationship, with strong disagreements for example over the moral basis of capitalism.

Contributions and influence in economics

Mises wrote and lectured extensively on behalf of classical liberalism. In his magnum opus Human Action, Mises adopted praxeology as a general conceptual foundation of the social sciences and set forth his methodological approach to economics.

Mises was for economic non-interventionism and was an anti-imperialist. He referred to the Great War as such a watershed event in human history and wrote that "war has become more fearful and destructive than ever before because it is now waged with all the means of the highly developed technique that the free economy has created. Bourgeois civilization has built railroads and electric power plants, has invented explosives and airplanes, in order to create wealth. Imperialism has placed the tools of peace in the service of destruction. With modern means it would be easy to wipe out humanity at one blow."

In 1920, Mises introduced in an article his Economic Calculation Problem as a critique of socialisms which are based on planned economies and renunciations of the price mechanism. In his first article "Economic Calculation in the Socialist Commonwealth", Mises describes the nature of the price system under capitalism and describes how individual subjective values are translated into the objective information necessary for rational allocation of resources in society. Mises argued that the pricing systems in socialist economies were necessarily deficient because, if a public entity owned all the means of production, no rational prices could be obtained for capital goods, as they were merely internal transfers of goods and not "objects of exchange", unlike final goods. Therefore, they were unpriced, and hence the system would be necessarily irrational, as the central planners would not know how to allocate the available resources efficiently. He wrote that "rational economic activity is impossible in a socialist commonwealth". Mises developed his critique of socialism more completely in his 1922 book Socialism: An Economic and Sociological Analysis, arguing that the market price system is an expression of praxeology and cannot be replicated by any form of bureaucracy.

Friends and students of Mises in Europe included Wilhelm Röpke and Alfred Müller-Armack (advisors to German chancellor Ludwig Erhard), Jacques Rueff (monetary advisor to Charles de Gaulle), Gottfried Haberler (later a professor at Harvard), Lionel, Lord Robbins (of the London School of Economics), Italian President Luigi Einaudi, and Leonid Hurwicz, recipient of the 2007 Nobel Memorial Prize in Economic Sciences. Economist and political theorist Friedrich Hayek first came to know Mises while working as his subordinate at a government office dealing with Austria's post-World War I debt. While toasting Mises at a party in 1956, Hayek said: "I came to know him as one of the best educated and informed men I have ever known". Mises's seminars in Vienna fostered lively discussion among established economists there. The meetings were also visited by other important economists who happened to be traveling through Vienna.

At his New York University seminar and at informal meetings at his apartment, Mises attracted college and high school students who had heard of his European reputation. They listened while he gave carefully prepared lectures from notes.Reisman, George, Capitalism: a Treatise on Economics, "Introduction," Jameson Books, 1996; and Mises, Margit von, My Years with Ludwig von Mises, 2nd enlarged edit., Center for Future Education, 1984, pp. 136–137. Among those who attended his informal seminar over the course of two decades in New York were: Israel Kirzner, Hans Sennholz, Ralph Raico, Leonard Liggio, George Reisman, and Murray Rothbard. Mises's work also influenced other Americans, including Benjamin Anderson, Leonard Read, Henry Hazlitt, Max Eastman, legal scholar Sylvester J. Petro and novelist Ayn Rand.

 Creation of the Mises Institute 

As a result of the economic works of Ludwig Von Mises, the Mises Institute was founded in 1982 by Lew Rockwell, Burton Blumert, and Murray Rothbard, following a split between the Cato Institute and Rothbard, who had been one of the founders of the Cato Institute.[non-primary source needed] It was funded by Ron Paul.

The Mises Institute offers thousands of free books written by Ludwig Von Mises, Murray Rothbard, Hans-Hermann Hoppe, and other prominent economists in e-book and audiobook format. For those unfamiliar with the concepts of Austrian Economics, it has a section designed for beginners that summarizes the main concepts in thirty minutes. The Mises Institute also offers a graduate school program.

 Reception 

 Debates about Mises's arguments 
Economic historian Bruce Caldwell wrote that in the mid-20th century, with the ascendance of positivism and Keynesianism, Mises came to be regarded by many as the "archetypal 'unscientific' economist". In a 1957 review of his book The Anti-Capitalistic Mentality, The Economist said of Mises: "Professor von Mises has a splendid analytical mind and an admirable passion for liberty; but as a student of human nature he is worse than null and as a debater he is of Hyde Park standard".  Conservative commentator Whittaker Chambers published a similarly negative review of that book in the National Review, stating that Mises's thesis that anti-capitalist sentiment was rooted in "envy" epitomized "know-nothing conservatism" at its "know-nothingest".

Scholar Scott Scheall called economist Terence Hutchison "the most persistent critic of Mises's apriorism", starting in Hutchison's 1938 book The Significance and Basic Postulates of Economic Theory and in later publications such as his 1981 book The Politics and Philosophy of Economics: Marxians, Keynesians, and Austrians. Scheall noted that Friedrich Hayek, later in his life (after Mises died), also expressed reservations about Mises's apriorism, such as in a 1978 interview where Hayek said that he "never could accept the ... almost eighteenth-century rationalism in his [Mises's] argument".

In a 1978 interview, Hayek said about Mises's book Socialism: 

Economist Milton Friedman considered Mises inflexible in his thinking, but added that Mises's difficult life and lack of acceptance by academia are the likely culprits: 

Economist Murray Rothbard, who studied under Mises, agreed he was uncompromising, but disputes reports of his abrasiveness. In his words, Mises was "unbelievably sweet, constantly finding research projects for students to do, unfailingly courteous, and never bitter" about the discrimination he received at the hands of the economic establishment of his time.

After Mises died, his widow Margit quoted a passage that he had written about Benjamin Anderson. She said it best described Mises's own personality: His most eminent qualities were his inflexible honesty, his unhesitating sincerity. He never yielded. He always freely enunciated what he considered to be true. If he had been prepared to suppress or only to soften his criticisms of popular, but irresponsible, policies, the most influential positions and offices would have been offered him. But he never compromised.

 Comments about fascism 
Marxists Herbert Marcuse and Perry Anderson as well as German writer Claus-Dieter Krohn criticized Mises for writing approvingly of Italian fascism, especially for its suppression of leftist elements, in his 1927 book Liberalism. In 2009, economist J. Bradford DeLong and sociologist Richard Seymour repeated the criticism.

Mises, in his 1927 book Liberalism, wrote: 

Mises biographer Jörg Guido Hülsmann says that critics who suggest that Mises supported fascism are "absurd" as he notes that the full quote describes fascism as dangerous. He notes that Mises said it was a "fatal error" to think that it was more than an "emergency makeshift" against up and coming communism and socialism as exemplified by the Bolsheviks in Russia and the surging communists of Germany. Hülsmann writes in Mises: The Last Knight of Liberalism that Mises had been a card-carrying member of the Fatherland Front party and that this was "probably mandatory for all employees of public and semi-public organizations."

In regards to Nazism, Mises called on the Allies in his 1944 book Omnipotent Government to "smash Nazism" and to "fight desperately until the Nazi power is completely broken".

Works

Books
 The Theory of Money and Credit (1912, enlarged US edition 1953)
 Full text available.
 Nation, State, and Economy (1919)
 Full text available.
 "Economic Calculation in the Socialist Commonwealth" (1920) (article)
 Socialism: An Economic and Sociological Analysis (1922, 1932, 1951)
 Full text available.
 Liberalismus (1927, 1962)
 Translated into English with the new title, The Free and Prosperous Commonwealth A Critique of Interventionism (1929) Full text available online.
 Epistemological Problems of Economics (1933, 1960)
 Epistemological Problems of Economics Memoirs (1940)
 Interventionism: An Economic Analysis (1941, 1998)
 Omnipotent Government: The Rise of Total State and Total War (1944)
 Bureaucracy (1944, 1962)
 Planned Chaos (1947, added to 1951 edition of Socialism)
 Planned Chaos Human Action: A Treatise on Economics (1949, 1963, 1966, 1996)
 Planning for Freedom (1952, enlarged editions in 1962, 1974, and 1980)
 The Anti-Capitalistic Mentality (1956)
 Full text available at the Ludwig von Mises Institute.
 Theory and History: An Interpretation of Social and Economic Evolution (1957)
 Full text available.
 Full audiobook available.
 The Ultimate Foundation of Economic Science (1962)
 The Ultimate Foundation of Economic Science The Historical Setting of the Austrian School of Economics (1969)
 The Historical Setting of the Austrian School of Economics Notes and Recollections (1978)
 The Clash of Group Interests and Other Essays (1978)
 On the Manipulation of Money and Credit (1978)
 The Causes of the Economic Crisis, reissue
 Economic Policy: Thoughts for Today and Tomorrow (1979, lectures given in 1959)
 Economic Policy: Thoughts for Today and Tomorrow Money, Method, and the Market Process (1990)
 Money, Method, and the Market Process Economic Freedom and Interventionism (1990)
 The Free Market and Its Enemies (2004, lectures given in 1951)
 The Free Market and Its Enemies Marxism Unmasked: From Delusion to Destruction (2006, lectures given in 1952)
 Ludwig von Mises on Money and Inflation (2010, lectures given in the 1960s)

Book reviews
 “Review of The Economic Munich by Philip Cortney”. The Freeman, March 1955. Full issue available.

 See also 

 Contributions to liberal theory
 Liberalism in Austria
 List of Austrian School economists
 Mises Institute – Alabama-based think tank
 Thymology

 References 

 Further reading 
 Butler, Eamonn, Ludwig von Mises – A Primer, Institute of Economic Affairs (2010).
 Ebeling, Richard M. Political Economy, Public Policy, and Monetary Economics: Ludwig von Mises and the Austrian Tradition, (London/New York: Routledge, 2010) 354 pages, .
 Ebeling, Richard M. "Ludwig von Mises: The Political Economist of Liberty, Part I", (The Freeman, May 2006).
 Ebeling, Richard M. "Ludwig von Mises: The Political Economist of Liberty, Part II", (The Freeman, June 2006).
 Ebeling, Richard M. "Ludwig von Mises and the Vienna of His Time, Part I", (The Freeman, March 2005).
 Ebeling, Richard M. "Ludwig von Mises and the Vienna of His Time, Part II", (The Freeman, April 2005).
 Ebeling, Richard M. "Austrian Economics and the Political Economy of Freedom", (The Freeman, June 2004).
 Gordon, David (2011-02-23) Mises's Epistemology, Ludwig von Mises Institute.
 Jones, Daniel Stedman. Masters of the Universe: Hayek, Friedman, and the Birth of Neoliberal Politics (2012), pp. 49–51.
 Rothbard, Murray N. "Mises, Ludwig Edler von," The New Palgrave: A Dictionary of Economics'', 1987, v. 3, pp. 479–480.
 
 Reviewed in: .

External links 

 Ludwig von Mises Institute Europe
 Mises.de (books and articles in the original German versions by Mises and other authors of the Austrian School)
 
 
 

1881 births
1973 deaths
20th-century American economists
20th-century American male writers
20th-century American non-fiction writers
20th-century American philosophers
20th-century Austrian male writers
20th-century Austrian philosophers
American economics writers
American libertarians
American male non-fiction writers
American political philosophers
American political writers
Austrian anti-communists
Austrian economists
Jewish emigrants from Austria to the United States after the Anschluss
Austrian libertarians
Austrian non-fiction writers
Austrian political philosophers
Austrian classical liberals
Austrian School economists
Burials at Ferncliff Cemetery
Critics of Marxism
Distinguished Fellows of the American Economic Association
Edlers of Austria
Academic staff of the Graduate Institute of International and Development Studies
Jewish American writers
Jewish anti-communists
Jewish philosophers
Libertarian theorists
New York University faculty
Non-interventionism
Writers from Lviv
Recipients of the Austrian Decoration for Science and Art
Social philosophy
University of Vienna alumni
Yiddish-speaking people
American anti-communists
Member of the Mont Pelerin Society